United States Lace Curtain Mills, also known as the Scranton Lace Company Kingston Mill, is a historic factory building located at Kingston, Ulster County, New York. It was completed about 1903, and is a complex of three parallel brick buildings connected by hyphens.  It operated as a textile manufacturing facility until 1951.

It was listed on the National Register of Historic Places in 2013.

References 

Industrial buildings and structures on the National Register of Historic Places in New York (state)
Industrial buildings completed in 1903
Buildings and structures in Ulster County, New York
National Register of Historic Places in Ulster County, New York
Kingston, New York